The men's 1000 metres race of the 2015–16 ISU Speed Skating World Cup 1, arranged in the Olympic Oval, in Calgary, Alberta, Canada, was held on 14 November 2015.

Gerben Jorritsma of the Netherlands won the race, while Pavel Kulizhnikov of Russia came second, and Kjeld Nuis of the Netherlands came third. Mika Poutala of Finland won the Division B race.

Results
The race took place on Saturday, 14 November, with Division B scheduled in the morning session, at 10:21, and Division A scheduled in the afternoon session, at 13:00.

Division A

Note: NR = national record.

Division B

Note: NR = national record.

References

Men 1000
1